The Westin Grand, Vancouver was a hotel in the Canadian city of Vancouver, British Columbia. It is located in the Yaletown neighbourhood at the intersection of Homer Street and Robson Street. It was rebranded to Hilton Vancouver Downtown in January 2021.

Facilities
The hotel's facilities include six meeting rooms, a fitness centre, an outdoor saltwater pool and a hot tub. The hotel is also home to Hendricks Resto-Lounge, a 100-seat restaurant located on the second floor. The building was designed by Bruno Freschi Architects and Lawrence Doyle Young & Wright Architects.

See also

 List of tallest buildings in Vancouver

References

External links
 

1999 establishments in British Columbia
Hotels established in 1999
Hotels in Vancouver
Skyscraper hotels in Canada
Skyscrapers in Vancouver
Buildings and structures in Vancouver